On October 4, 2012, the International Rugby Board, now known as World Rugby, announced the launch of a circuit now known as the World Rugby Women's Sevens Series, the women's counterpart to the World Rugby Sevens Series for men. The inaugural 2012–13 season featured four events, with the USA Women's Sevens taking place at BBVA Compass Stadium in Houston as the second event in February 2013.

The following are details of all official regional women's international championship played in the USA since the first tournament in 2006, listed chronologically with the earliest first, with all result details, where known.

Rugby sevens background
Rugby sevens - a short form of the sport of rugby union - was first played in 1883, with the first (men's) internationals taking place in 1973. As women's rugby union developed in the 1960s and 1970s the format became very popular as it allowed games, and entire leagues, to be developed in countries even when player numbers were small, and it remains the main form the women's game is played in most parts of the world.

However, although the first Women's international rugby union 15-a-side test match took place in 1982, it was not until 1997 before the first Women's International Rugby Union Sevens tournaments were played, when the Hong Kong Sevens included a women's tournament for the first time. Over the next decade the number of tournaments grew, with almost every region developing regular championship. This reached its zenith with 2009's inaugural women's tournament for the Rugby World Cup Sevens, shortly followed by the announcement that women's rugby sevens will be included in the Olympics from 2016.

Results
Summary of results in the United States leg of the World Rugby Women's Sevens Series:

USA Tournament 2006 
Venue: Los Angeles, USA (Source USA Rugby)
USA 5-0 Canada
Note: Believed to be as an exhibition match. It is also possible that the teams played a second time, before the final of the men's competition.

USA Tournament 2007
Played at San Diego, USA, on 9 and 10 February 2007 (Source USA Rugby)

Known Participants: USA A, USA B, Canada A, Canada B, China

China bt Canada A
Canada B bt China
USA A bt China
USA B bt China

Final
Canada B bt USA A
China 4th

USA Sevens 2008
Venue/Date: San Diego, 9–10 February 2008
Initially Kazakhstan, China, New Zealand and Australia were expected

Pool 1
Canada, USA A, Canada Collegiate

Pool 2
USA, Canada A, South Africa
Plus exhibition match USA vs South Africa

Group stages  Although in groups of three, four teams played three games whilst the two A teams only played 2 each.  The results are presented as one table.

Canada A 5-21 South Africa
Canada Collegiate 0-15 USA A
USA 21-7 South Africa
Canada 29-5 Canada Collegiate
USA 24-0 Canada A
Canada 26-10 USA A
Canada 19-10 South Africa
USA 15-0 Canada Collegiate

Classification matches
5th Place
Canada Collegiate 10-24 South Africa
3rd Place
USA A 12-20 Canada A
Final
USA 19-5 Canada
Exhibition Match
USA 17-12 South Africa

USA Sevens 2009
Venue/Date: 9 February 2009. San Diego (alongside the IRB event).

This tournament is ostensibly a World Cup warm up.  There are 7 teams (including USA 2) and rather than playing in groups, each team plays three opponents and they are then all assessed to decide the classification participants.
The teams (in "seed" order)are England, NZ Maori, Canada, USA, USA 2, China, Japan
The subsequent classification games place Japan above China but the Chinese results are better against tougher opponents, as is the points for and points difference.  Japan also appear to have played four games.

Group Games
POOL A
England 36-0 Japan
Canada 17-5 USA 2
USA 21-0 China
NZ Maori 36-0 Japan
England 15-7 USA 2
Canada 26-5 China
USA 45-0 Japan
NZ Maori 22-12 Canada
USA 2 15-5 Japan
England 19-0 USA
NZ Maori 14-12 China

Classification Games
5th 6th Play-off
USA 2 17-7 Japan
Semi Final 1st vs 4th
England 29-0 Canada
Semi Final 2nd vs 3rd
USA 12-0 New Zealand
Final
England 17-12 USA (sudden death, 12-12 at full time)

USA Sevens 2010
Venue/Date: 12 February 2009. Whitney, Nevada (alongside the IRB event).
POOL A

USA White 19-12 China
France 29-12 USA Blue
USA White 29-12 Germany
Canada University 14-0 France
China 24-19 Germany
Canada University 17-10 USA Blue
USA White 17-7 Canada University
France 29-0 Germany
China 36-0 USA Blue
5th/6th place
USA Blue 38-12 Germany

Semi-finals
Semifinal: USA White 17-7 Canada National University
Semifinal: China 26-14 France

3rd/4th place
Canada University 31-0 France

Final
USA White 0-10 China

USA Sevens 2011
Date/Venue: February 11–13, 2011. Whitney, Nevada
Australia, Brazil and Kenya were originally expected, and Kenya only withdrew a week before due to visa problems, being replaced by the Hawaiian Select. Tyrolian Select - from the Women Rugby Club, Innsburck - had originally intended to take part in the club event. The final was broadcast on NBC in North America.
POOL A

USA 43-0 Tyrolian Select
Canada 12-10 Netherlands
USA 15-21 Netherlands
Canada 66-0 Tyrolian Select
USA 7-5 Canada
Netherlands 89-0 Tyrolian Select

5th to 8th Place
USA 17-5 Hawaii Select
Maple Leafs 52-0 Tyrolian Select
7th Place
Hawaii Select 34-0 Tyrolian Select
5th Place
USA 26-7 Maple Leafs
POOL B

France 21-7 Maple Leafs
Spain 26-7 Hawaii Select
France 36-0 Hawaii Select
Spain 20-5 Maple Leafs
France 12-14 Spain
Hawaii Select 0-26 Maple Leafs

Semi Finals
Spain 0-15 Canada
Netherlands 17-7 France
3rd Place
Spain 12-15 France
Final
Canada 17-12 Netherlands

USA Sevens 2012
 Chile and "Adler Sevens" (German development team) also took part in the Women's Elite Sevens. Adler beat Chile 22-5 on the way to winning the tournament.
Date/Venue: February 10–12, 2012. Whitney, Nevada
POOL A

Netherlands 12-5 Stars & Stripes
Canada 26-0 Brazil
Netherlands 36-0 Brazil
Canada 26-7 Stars & Stripes
Brazil 5-36 Stars & Stripes
Canada 28-0 Netherlands

5th to 8th Place
Maple Leafs 5-12 Brazil
Stars & Stripes 14-5 Japan

7th Place
Maple Leafs 27-14 Japan
5th Place
Brazil 21-19 Stars & Stripes
POOL B

France 14-5 Maple Leafs
USA 17-5 Japan
France 19-0 Japan
USA 22-7 Maple Leafs
Japan 0-22 Maple Leafs
USA 19-12 France

Semi Finals
Canada 21-12 France
USA 17-5 Netherlands

3rd Place
Netherlands 12-17 France
Final
USA 5-14 Canada

Women's Sevens World Series (USA)
Venue: Houston 1–2 February 2013

Group A

 50-0 
 17-7 
 14-35 
 48-0 
 38-5 
 7-5 

Group B

 0-27 
 12-12 
 19-22 
 0-31 
 0-41 
 24-14 

Plate Semi Finals (5th-8th)
Netherlands 19-5 Canada
Russia 20-0 South Africa

7th/8th Match 
Canada 33-0 South Africa

Plate final: 5th/6th Match 
Netherlands 10-29 Russia

Group C

 31-12 
 27-0 
 22-0 
 24-5 
 12-17 
 15-10 

Bowl Semi Finals (9th-12th)
Japan 12-7 Trinidad
Brazil 25-5 Argentina

11th/12th Match 
Trinidad 5-25 Argentina

Bowl final:9th/10th Match 
Japan 7-12 Brazil

Quarter-finals (1st-8th)
 England 19-14 Netherlands
 USA 15-7 Russia
 Canada 10-12 New Zealand
 Australia 17-12 South Africa (AET)

Cup Semi Finals (1st-4th)
England 19-12 New Zealand
United States 17-5 Australia

3rd/4th place
New Zealand 12-17 Australia

Cup Final: 1st/2nd place
England 29-12 United States

USA Sevens 2013

Venue: Sam Boyd Stadium, Whitney, Nevada 8–9 February 2013

Pool A

USA Stars 36-0 Argentina
Maple Leafs Black 14-0 Laia Parkside
USA Stars 14-0 Laia Parkside
Maple Leafs Black 40-0 Argentina
USA Stars 0-17 Maple Leafs Black
Argentina 14-0 Laia Parkside

Pool B

Maple Leafs Red 38-0 Beavers International Elite
Trinidad & Tobago 7-25 Emperor's Atlantis 
Maple Leafs Red 29-5 Emperor's Atlantis
Trinidad & Tobago 5-12 Beavers International Elite 
Maple Leafs Red 55-0 Trinidad & Tobago
Emperor's Atlantis 12-7 Beavers International Elite

Plate Semi Finals (5th-8th)

7th/8th Match 

Plate final: 5th/6th Match 

Group C

Japan 29-0 Combined Services
USA Stripes 29-0 Dog River Howlers
Japan 19-7 Dog River Howlers
USA Stripes 26-0 Combined Services
Japan 14-33 USA Stripes
Combined Services 7-12 Dog River Howlers

Bowl Semi Finals (9th-12th)
Combined Services v Laia Parkside
Argentina v Trinidad & Tobago

11th/12th Match 

Bowl final:9th/10th Match 

Quarter-finals (1st-8th)
Maple Leafs Red bt Dog River Howlers
USA Stars lost to Japan
USA Stripes v Beavers International
Maple Leafs Black bt Emperors Atlantis

Cup Semi Finals (1st-4th)
Maple Leafs Red bt Japan
USA Stripes lost to Maple Leafs Black

3rd/4th place
Japan v USA Stripes

Cup Final: 1st/2nd place
Maple Leafs Red 19-0 Maple Leafs Black

Women's Sevens World Series (USA) 2014

Venue: Fifth Third Bank Stadium, Kennesaw, Georgia, 15–16 February 2014

Group A

Australia  31-0  China
Canada  31-0  United States
Australia  17-0  United States
Canada  47-0 China
United States 41-0 China
Australia  7-12  Canada

Group B

New Zealand 21-0 Netherlands
England  22-0 Ireland
New Zealand 36-7 Ireland
England 19-12 Netherlands
Ireland 12-10 Netherlands
New Zealand 14-5 England

Plate Semi Finals (5th-8th)
United States 19-5 England 
Spain 24-0 Japan

7th/8th Match 
England 19-12 Japan

Plate final: 5th/6th Match 
United States 22-0 Spain

Group C

Russia  29-0  Japan
Spain  19-5  Brazil
Russia  42-5  Brazil
Spain  7-12  Japan
Brazil 7-21 Japan
Russia 19-14 Spain

Bowl Semi Finals (9th-12th)
Ireland 7-26 China
Netherlands 17-10 Brazil

11th/12th Match 
Ireland 5-20 Brazil

Bowl final:9th/10th Match 
China 0-33 Netherlands

Quarter-finals (1st-8th)
Canada 26-12 USA
Australia 17-12 (AET) England
Russia 29-0 Spain
New Zealand 42-0 Japan

Cup Semi Finals (1st-4th)
Canada 17-7 Australia 
Russia 7-24 New Zealand

3rd/4th place
Australia 22-12 Russia

Cup Final: 1st/2nd place
Canada 0-36 New Zealand

Women's Sevens World Series (USA) 2015

Venue: Fifth Third Bank Stadium, Kennesaw, Georgia 14–15 February 2015

Group A

New Zealand 17-12 Russia
United States 36-5 South Africa
New Zealand 52-0 South Africa
United States 19-12 Russia
New Zealand 57-0 United States
Russia 43-0 South Africa

Group C

Canada 28-0 Brazil
England 33-7 China
Canada 31-14 China
England 24-0 Brazil
Canada 10-26 England
Brazil 17-7 China

Plate Semi Finals (5th-8th)
Brazil 0-43 France
Australia 24-12 England

7th/8th Match 
Brazil 10-31 England

Plate final: 5th/6th Match 
France 17-26 Australia

Group B

Australia 36-0 Fiji
France 36-0 Spain
Australia 24-7 Spain
France 12-10 Fiji
Australia 19-7 France
Fiji 14-19 Spain

Bowl Semi Finals (9th-12th)
Spain 24-0 South Africa
Fiji 24-0 China

11th/12th Match 
South Africa 7-26 China

Bowl final:9th/10th Match 
Spain - Fiji

Quarter-finals (1st-8th)
New Zealand 36-0 Brazil
Canada 24-12 France
Australia 5-10 United States
England 0-24 Russia

Cup Semi Finals (1st-4th)
New Zealand 24-22 Canada
United States 19-14 Russia

3rd/4th place
Canada 28-17 Russia

Cup Final: 1st/2nd place
New Zealand 50-12 United States

World Rugby Women's Sevens Series (USA) 2016

World Rugby Women's Sevens Series (USA) 2017

World Rugby Women's Sevens Series (USA) 2018
USA Rugby did not host an event in the 2017–18 World Rugby Women's Sevens Series, although it hosted the corresponding event in that season's men's Sevens Series. It chose to focus its resources on hosting the 2018 Rugby World Cup Sevens for both sexes in San Francisco.

The USA Women's Sevens returned for the 2018–19 series, but it moved from March to October, becoming the season opener. Also, the tournament moved to a new site—Infinity Park in the Denver suburb of Glendale, Colorado.

World Rugby Women's Sevens Series (USA) 2019

See also
 USA Sevens

References

 
Women
World Rugby Women's Sevens Series tournaments
International women's rugby union competitions hosted by the United States
Rugby sevens competitions in the United States